Intelligent Creatures (IC) is a motion picture visual effects company located in Toronto, Ontario, Canada.

History
IC was founded on March 30, 2001 by current CEO Lon Molnar, a graduate of the Vancouver Film School, Michael Hatton, Raymond Gieringer, and Wendy Lanning, and commenced production in 2002. The company was created in response to the demands of the visual effects industry, at a time when there was a shortage of visual effects vendors in Toronto.

Location
IC's studio is located in the east end of Toronto, in close proximity to Pinewood Toronto Studios and Cinespace Film Studios. A satellite office is located in North Bay, Ontario.

Projects
IC has worked with film studios such as Warner Bros., Walt Disney Pictures, Columbia Pictures, New Line Cinema, Paramount, and 20th Century Studios.

The company has worked on films such as Zack Snyder's Watchmen (for which it designed Dave Gibbon's character Rorschach), Darren Aronofsky's The Fountain, and Alejandro González Iñárritu's Babel, Stranger than Fiction, Battle: Los Angeles, and Mr. & Mrs. Smith. Titles currently in production include Omega, Orphan Black, Transporter: The Series and The Last Druid: Garm Wars.

IC has received a nomination for Best Visual Effects in a Broadcast Program from the Visual Effects Society for its work on Secret Universe: Journey Inside the Cell / Battlefield Cell (one part of the Discovery Channel's Curiosity).

IC Filmography

References

VES Awards 2013 nominees

External links
 IMDB
 Official Website

Entertainment companies established in 2001
Film production companies of Canada
Visual effects companies
Companies based in Toronto